Turkish vocabulary is the set of words within the Turkish language. The language widely uses agglutination and suffixes to form words from noun and verb stems. Besides native Turkic words, Turkish vocabulary is rich in loanwords from Arabic, Persian, French and other languages.

This article is a companion to Turkish grammar and contains some information that might be considered grammatical. The purpose of this article is mainly to show the use of some of the yapım ekleri "structural suffixes" of the Turkish language, as well as to give some of the structurally important words, like pronouns, determiners, postpositions, and conjunctions.

Origins

In the ninth century, Turks began to convert to Islam and to use the Arabic alphabet. When the Seljuk Turks overran Iran (Persia), they adopted for official and literary use the Persian language. Thus educated Turks had available for their use the vocabularies of three languages: Turkish, Arabic, and Persian.

When the Ottoman Empire arose out of the remains of the Selcuk Empire in Anatolia, its official language, Osmanlıca or Ottoman Turkish, became the only language to approach English in the size of its vocabulary (according to #Lewis). However, common people continued to use kaba Türkçe or "rough Turkish" which contained much fewer loanwords and which is the basis of the modern Turkish language. 

With the advent of the Turkish Republic in 1923 came the attempt to unify the languages of the people and the administration, and to westernize the country. The modern Turkish alphabet, based on the Latin script, was introduced. Also, Arabic and Persian words were replaced, as possible, by:
Turkish words surviving in speech, obsolete Turkish words, new words formed regularly from the agglutinative resources of Turkish, thoroughly new words or formations. However, still a large portion of current Turkish words have Arabic or Persian origins.
Turkish has words borrowed from Greek due to the Ottoman Empire having conquered the Byzantine Empire. There are also borrowings from other European languages, or from the common technical vocabulary of Europe.
In the latter case, the borrowings are usually taken in their French pronunciation.

Nouns

Turkish nouns and pronouns have no grammatical gender (the same pronoun o means "he", "she" or "it"), but have six grammatical cases: nominative or absolute (used for the subject or an indefinite direct object), accusative (used for a definite direct object), dative (= to), locative (= in), ablative (= from), genitive (= of). There are two grammatical numbers, singular and plural.

Nouns from nouns and adjectives
The suffix -ci attached to a noun denotes a person involved with what is named by the noun:
{| class=wikitable
! Noun !! Noun + -ci
|-
| iş "work" || işçi "worker"
|-
| balık "fish" || balıkçı "fisherman"
|-
| gazete "newspaper" || gazeteci "newsagent", "journalist"
|-
|}

The suffix -lik attached to a noun or adjective denotes an abstraction, or an object involved with what is named by the noun:
{| class=wikitable
! Noun !! Noun + -lik
|-
| iyi "good" || iyilik "goodness"
|-
| tuz "salt" || tuzluk "salt shaker"
|-
| gün "day" || günlük "diary", "daily" (adverb)
|-
| gece "night" || gecelik "nightgown"
|-
|}

Nouns from verbs

The noun in -im denoting an instance of action was mentioned in the introduction to Turkish grammar.
yat- "lie down",
yatır- "lay down",
yatırım "investment".

For more examples on word derivations, see the related article: List of replaced loanwords in Turkish.

Adjectives

Classification of adjectives
Adjectives can be distinguished as being
descriptive (niteleme "qualifying"), or
determinative (belirtme): in particular:
demonstrative (gösterme "to show" or işaret "sign"),
numerical (sayı "number"),
indefinite (belirsizlik or belgisiz),
interrogative (soru "question").

For an intensive form, the first consonant and vowel of a (descriptive) adjective can be reduplicated; a new consonant is added too, m, p, r, or s, but there is no simple rule for which one:
{| class=wikitable
! Adjective !! Intensive Form
|-
| başka "other" || bambaşka "completely different"
|-
| katı  "hard" || kaskatı  "hard as a rock"
|-
| kuru  "dry" || kupkuru  "dry as a bone"
|-
| temiz "clean" || tertemiz "clean as a whistle"
|}

The determinative adjectives, or determiners, are an essential part of the language, although Turkish takes some of its determiners from Arabic and Persian.

Demonstrative adjectives
o "that",
bu "this",
şu "this" or "that" (thing pointed to).
These are also demonstrative pronouns.  Used with plural nouns, these adjectives represent the English "those" and "these"; there is no such inflexion of adjectives in Turkish.

Numerical adjectives
The cardinal numbers are built up in a regular way from the following:

{| class="wikitable"
|- align="center"
! rowspan=2 | 0-9
! 0
! 1
! 2
! 3
! 4
! 5
! 6
! 7
! 8
! 9
|- align="center"
| sıfır
| bir
| iki
| üç
| dört
| beş
| altı
| yedi
| sekiz
| dokuz
|- align="center"
! rowspan=2 | Multiples of Ten
| rowspan=2 | — 
! 10 !! 20 !! 30 !! 40 !! 50 !! 60 !! 70 !! 80 !! 90
|- align="center"
| on
| yirmi
| otuz
| kırk
| elli
| altmış
| yetmiş
| seksen
| doksan
|}

{| class="wikitable"
! rowspan=2 | Powers of Ten
! 10 !! 100 !! 1,000 !! 1,000,000 !! 1,000,000,000
|-
| on || yüz || bin || milyon || milyar
|}

Units follow multiples of ten; powers of ten come in descending order. For example: 
yüz kırk dokuz milyar beş yüz doksan yedi milyon sekiz yüz yetmiş bin altı yüz doksan bir metre ("149,597,870,691 metres").
{|
|-
| yüz || kırk || dokuz || milyar
|-
| [one] hundred || forty || nine || billion
|}

{|
|-
| beş ||yüz || doksan || yedi || milyon
|-
| five || hundred || ninety || seven || million
|}

{|
|-
|sekiz || yüz || yetmiş || bin
|-
| eight || hundred || seventy || thousand
|}

{|
|-
|altı || yüz || doksan || bir || metre
|-
| six || hundred || ninety || one || metres
|}

The cardinals are generally not used alone, but a general word for a unit is used, such as:
tane, literally "grain";
kişi "person".

Remembering that the plural suffix is not used when numbers are named, we have:
dört tane bira "four beers";
Altı kişiyiz "We are six."

From the cardinal numbers, others can be derived with suffixes:
ordinal -(i)nci
 yedi "seven" → yedinci "seventh"
 Sırada yedincisiniz.
"You are seventh in line."
distributive -(ş)er
 bir "one" → birer "one each"
 iki "two" → ikişer "two each"
collective -(i)z
 iki "two" → ikizler "twins"

Indefinite adjectives
The cardinal bir "one" can be used as an indefinite article.
Other so-called indefinite adjectives might be listed as follows:
universal: her "each, every", tüm "the whole", bütün "whole, all";
existential: bazı "some", biraz "a little", birkaç "a few, several";
negative: hiç "none";
quantitative: az "little, few", çok "much, many";
distinguishing: başka, diğer, öteki, öbür "other";
identifying: aynı "same".

Interrogative adjectives
hangi "which?"
kaç "how much?" or "how many?"
 Saat kaç? "What time is it?"
 Kaç saat? "How many hours?"
nasıl "what sort?" (this is also the interrogative adverb "how?")

Adjectives from nouns

Added to a noun, -li or -siz indicates presence or absence, respectively, of what is named by the noun.
{| class=wikitable
! Noun !! Presence (-li) !! Absence (-siz)
|-
| tuz "salt" || tuzlu "salted" || tuzsuz "salt-free"
|-
| umut "hope" || umutlu "hopeful" || umutsuz "hopeless"
|}

The suffix -li also indicates origin:
Ankaralıyım. "I am from Ankara."

Finally, added to the verbal noun in -me, the suffix -li creates the necessitative verb.
Pattern: (verb-stem) + me + li + (personal ending).
Gitmeliyim. "I must go".

The native speaker may perceive -meli as an indivisible suffix denoting compulsion.

Added to a noun for a person, -ce makes an adjective.
{| class=wikitable
! Noun !! Adjective (Noun + -ce)
|-
| çocuk "child" || çocukça "childish"
|-
| kahraman "hero" || kahramanca "heroic"
|-
|}

Adverbs

Adjectives can generally serve as adverbs:
iyi "good" or "well"

The adjective might then be repeated, as noted earlier.  A repeated noun also serves as an adverb:
kapı "door" → kapı kapı "door-to-door"

The suffix -ce makes nouns and adjectives into adverbs.  One source (Özkırımlı, p. 155) calls it the benzerlik ("similarity") or görelik (from göre "according to") eki, considering it as another case-ending.
 Attached to adjectives, -ce is like the English -ly:
güzelce "beautifully"
 Attached to nouns, -ce can be like the English like:
Türkçe konuş- "speak like Turks" (i.e., "speak Turkish")

Adverbs of place include:
aşağı/yukarı "down/up"
geri/ileri "backwards/forwards"
dışarı/içeri "outside/inside"
beri/öte "hither/yon"
karşı "opposite"

These can also be treated as adjectives and nouns (in particular, they can be given case-endings).
Also, the suffix -re can be added to the demonstrative pronouns o, bu, and şu, as well as to the interrogative pronoun ne, treated as a noun. The result has cases serving as adverbs of place:
nereye/buraya/oraya "whither?/hither/thither"
nerede/burada/orada "where?/here/there"
nereden/buradan/oradan "whence?/hence/thence"

Postpositions

With genitive and absolute

The following are used after the genitive pronouns benim, bizim, senin, sizin, onun, and kimin, and after the absolute case of other pronouns and nouns:
gibi "like, as";
için "for";
ile "with";
kadar (Arabic) "as much as".

For example, a certain company may describe its soft drink as:
{|
| buz || gibi 
|-
| ice || like
|-
| colspan=2 | "like ice", "ice cold"
|}

However, another company may say of itself:
{|
| Gibisi || yok. 
|-
| its-like || non-existent
|-
| colspan=2 | "There's nothing like it."
|}

Thus the label of postposition does not adequately describe gibi; Schaaik proposes calling it a predicate, because of its use in establishing similarity:
{|
| Eşek || gibisin. 
|-
| donkey || you-are-like
|-
| colspan=2 | "You are like a donkey."
|}

{|
| beni || küçümseyecekmiş || gibi || bir || duygu
|-
| me- || s/he-will-look-down-on || like || a || feeling
|-
| colspan=5 | "a feeling as if s/he will look down on me"
|}

The particle ile can be both comitative and instrumental; it can also join the preceding word as a suffix. Examples:
Deniz ile konuştuk or Deniz'le konuştuk
"Deniz and I [or we], we spoke."
(here the literal translation "We spoke with Deniz" may be incorrect)
çekiç ile vur- or çekiçle vur-
"hit with a hammer"

With dative

Used after nouns and pronouns in the dative case are:
doğru "towards";
göre "according to";
kadar "as far as";
karşı "against".

With ablative

önce/sonra "before/after";
beri "since";
itibaren (Arabic) "from…on";
dolayı "because of".

With absolute

The following postpositions are case-forms of nouns with the third-person possessional suffix; they can be understood as forming nominal compounds, always indefinite, with the preceding words (see also Turkish grammar#Nouns):
bakımdan "from the point of view of" (bak- "look");
hakkında "concerning, about" (hak "right, justice");
tarafından "by the agency of" (taraf "side");
yüzünden "because of" (yüz "face").

Interjections
Some samples include:
secular:
 Öf [disgust];
Haydi "Come on": Haydi kızlar okula "Girls to school!" (slogan for an education campaign);
invoking the Deity:
implicitly:
Aman "Mercy";
Çok şükür "Much thanks";
explicitly:
Allah Allah "Goodness gracious";
Hay Allah;
Vallah "By God [I swear it]".

Conjunctions
Some Turkish conjunctions are borrowed from Persian and Arabic.

Logical conjunction

The cumulative sense of the English "A and B" can be expressed several ways:
A ve B (an Arabic borrowing);
B ile A (ile is also a postposition);
A, B de.

For the adversative sense of "but" or "only", there are ama and fakat (both Arabic), also yalnız (which is also an adjective corresponding to "alone").

For emphasis: hem A hem B "both A and B".

Logical disjunction
For the sense of English "(either)…or":
A veya B;
ya A veya B;
ya A ya da B.
The pattern of the last two can be extended:
ya A ya B veya C;
ya A ya B ya da C.

Logical non-disjunction

Ne A ne B "Neither A nor B":
NE ABD NE AB TAM BAĞIMSIZ DEMOKRATİK TÜRKİYE 
"Neither USA nor EU: Fully Independent Democratic Turkey"

Ne is borrowed from Persian na(نه) which means no. The usage is the same in Persian.

(slogan on placard at demonstration);
Ne A ne B ne C "Not A or B or C."

Implication

B, çünkü A "B, because A".
((Eğer)) A'ysa, (o zaman) B'dir. "If A, then B." ("Eğer" is not generally used.)
Both çünkü and eğer are Persian; the latter is not generally needed, because the conditional form of the verb is available.

The conjunction ki

The Persian conjunction ki brings to Turkish the Indo-European style of relating ideas (#Lewis [XIII,15]):
Beklemesini istiyorum "Her-waiting I-desire"; but
İstiyorum ki beklesin "I-desire that he-wait."

Thus ki corresponds roughly to English "that", but with a broader sense:
Güneş batmıştı ki köye vardık "The-sun had-set [when] that at-the-village we-arrived."
Kirazı yedim ki şeker gibi "The-cherry I-ate [and found] that [it was] sugar like."

The following is from a newspaper:
             "Vahdettin ne yazık ki haindi"
...Bu iki açıklamadan anlıyoruz ki 
Ecevit, Osmanlı Tarihi adlı bir kitap hazırlıyormuş...
Vahdettin, Tevfik Paşa ve Londra Konferansı hakkındaki açıklamaları gösteriyor ki
Sayın Ecevit, yakın tarihimizi ciddi olarak incelememiş,
bu konudaki güvenilir araştırmaları ve sağlam belgeleri görmemiş...
Diyor ki:
"Benim şahsen çocukluğumdan beri dinlediğim şeyler var..."

"...From these two accounts, we understand that 
Ecevit is preparing a book called Ottoman History...
His accounts concerning Vahdettin, Tevfik Pasha and the London Conference show that 
Mr Ecevit has not seriously studied our recent history, 
has not seen trustworthy research and sound documentation on this subject...
He says that: 
"'There are many things I heard personally from my childhood till today...'"
(Source: Cumhuriyet 19 July 2005.)

Verbs

The verb-stem temizle- "make clean" is the adjective temiz "clean" with the suffix -le-.  Many verbs are formed from nouns or adjectives with -le:
başla- "make a head", that is, "begin" (intransitive; baş "head");
kilitle- "make locked", that is, "lock" (kilit "lock");
kirlet- "make dirty" (kir "dirt")
köpekle- (from köpek "dog", discussed at Turkish grammar#Parts of speech).

The suffix -iş- indicates reciprocal action, which is expressed in English by "each other" or "one another".

görüşmek "to see one another" (from görmek "to see", for example Görüşürüz, "Goodbye"
(literally "We see one another"))

(But there are exceptions: sevişmek does not mean "to love one another" (from sevmek "to love") but rather "to make love with each other."

Many causative verbs are formed with -dir-.

öldürmek "to kill" (from ölmek "to die")
yaptırmak "to have something done" (from yapmak "to do")

References

Books of use in the writing of this article include:
Grammars:
Kaya Can, Yabancılar İçin Türkçe-İngilizce Açıklama Türkçe Dersleri, Ankara: Orta Doğu Teknik Üniversitesi, Fen ve Edebiyat Fakültesi, 1991.  "Turkish lessons with Turkish-English explanation[s] for foreigners".
G. L. Lewis, Turkish Grammar, Oxford University Press, 1967; second edition, 2000.  [Structural differences between the two editions are not named in the second, but appear to be as follows:  IV,4 "-çe", VI,7 "Arithmetical terms", XI,16 "-diğinde", and XII,25 "tâ" are new, while XV,1 "Nominal sentences and verbal sentences" in the first edition was dropped.
Eran Oyal, Sözcüklerin Anlamsal ve Yapısal Özellikleri: Konular, Örnekler, Sorular, Açıklama Yanıtlar (ÖSS ve ÖYS için Dil Yeteneği Dizisi 2), Ankara, 1986.  "Semantic and syntactic properties of words: subjects, examples, questions, answers with explanation (language ability for the university entrance examinations, 2)".
Atilla Özkırımlı, Türk Dili, Dil ve Anlatım, İstanbul Bilgi Üniversitesi Yayınları 2001.  "The Turkish language, language, and expression".
Bengisu Rona, Turkish in Three Months, Hugo's Language Books Limited, 1989.
Gerjan van Schaaik, The Bosphorus Papers: Studies in Turkish Grammar 1996–1999, İstanbul: Boğaziçi University Press, 2001.
Dictionaries:
İsmet Zeki Eyuboğlu, Türk Dilinin Etimoloji Sözlüğü, expanded and revised second edition, 1991.
H.-J. Kornrumpf, Langenscheidt's Universal Dictionary: English-Turkish, Turkish-English, Istanbul; new edition revised and updated by Resuhi Akdikmen, 1989.
Redhouse Yeni Türkçe-İngilizce Sözlük.  New Redhouse Turkish-English Dictionary.  Redhouse Yayınevi, İstanbul, 1968 (12th ed., 1991).
Redhouse Büyük Elsözlüğü İngilizce-Türkçe, Türkçe-İngilizce.  The Larger Redhouse Portable Dictionary English-Turkish, Turkish-English.  Redhouse Yayınevi, İstanbul 1997 (9th printing, 1998).
Türk Dil Kurumu [Turkish Language Foundation], Türkçe Sözlük, expanded 7th edition, 1983.

External links
 
 

Vocabulary
Lexis (linguistics)